Miramar is a city in southern Broward County, Florida, United States. As of the 2020 census, the population was 134,721. It is a principal city of the Miami metropolitan area, which is home to approximately six million people.

History

Miramar was founded by A.L. Mailman to serve as a "bedroom community" for nearby Miami and Fort Lauderdale.  Mailman bought the original property he was to develop from H.D. Perry, Sr. in 1953. He built 56 homes on the property that were inexpensive homes of concrete and flat roofs. These homes sold quickly because of the low cost of both the homes and the land, and the city of Miramar came into being.

The city was incorporated on May 26, 1955, and was named for the Miramar area of Havana, Cuba where Mailman had a summer home (Miramar translates to "look at the sea" in Spanish). At the time of incorporation, the city had a population of less than two hundred people. With approximately 2.9 square miles of land area, Miramar's original city boundaries were Southwest 64 Avenue on the east, University Drive on the west, the Dade County line on the south, and Pembroke Road on the north.  On June 20, 1955, the city's first mayor (Robert Gordon) and city council were sworn in, all of whom were appointed by the governor and served until January 1959, at which time the first municipal election was held. Mayor Robert Gordon is the individual who is attributed to have given the city its name. The city seal is inscribed with the motto "Beauty and Progress".

H.D. Perry Sr.'s part in Miramar did not cease with selling the land to Mailman for development. He is recognized as one of the foremost pioneers in the history of Miramar.  His character and civic-activities influenced not only the lives of early residents but continues to the present day, as evidenced by the schools and parks in the city which bear his family's name. Many long-time residents fondly recall the community barbecues hosted by Mr. and Mrs. Perry during those early years.  Others are grateful to Mr. Perry for the lessons in animal husbandry, which he conducted for the benefit of Miramar's youth so that they could learn something of farm life.

The only major roads when Miramar was developed were U.S. 441 which was a two-lane road at that time, Hallandale Beach Boulevard to Southwest 66 Terrace and Pembroke Road which was a dirt road to University Drive. There were no other transportation routes of any kind supplying access to the new community. Miramar's early city fathers advocated the philosophy of planned and controlled growth. The city adopted a Comprehensive Land Use Plan in 1972 before cities and counties were mandated to do so. This provided the framework for the orderly development of future growth. Two-thirds of the land within city limits is currently undeveloped.

Geography

A 2017 study put the city in fifth place for US cities most vulnerable to coastal flooding, with 93,000 residents living within FEMA's coastal floodplain.

The city is bordered by the following municipalities:

To the north:
 Pembroke Pines

To the northeast:
 Hollywood

To the east:
 West Park

To the south:
 Miami-Dade County

Demographics

2020 census

As of the 2020 United States census, there were 134,721 people, 39,853 households, and 31,042 families residing in the city.

2010 census

As of 2010, there were 40,294 households, with 7.1% being vacant. As of 2000, 48.2% had children under the age of 18 living with them, 56.0% were married couples living together, 19.1% had a female householder with no husband present, and 19.1% were non-families. 14.3% of all households were made up of individuals, and 3.3% had someone living alone who was 65 years of age or older. The average household size was 3.15 and the average family size was 3.48.

In 2000, the city's population was spread out, with 31.0% under the age of 18, 8.6% from 18 to 24, 35.4% from 25 to 44, 18.7% from 45 to 64, and 6.3% who were 65 years of age or older. The median age was 32 years. For every 100 females, there were 90.8 males. For every 100 females age 18 and over, there were 85.0 males.

In 2000, the median income for a household in the city was $50,289, and the median income for a family was $52,952. Males had a median income of $34,145 versus $28,283 for females. The per capita income for the city was $18,462. About 7.0% of families and 8.2% of the population were below the poverty line, including 9.8% of those under age 18 and 8.5% of those age 65 or over.

As of 2000, speakers of English as their first language accounted for 60.09% of the population, while Spanish made up 29.99%, French Creole 4.37%, French 2.13%, and Tagalog as a mother tongue was 0.50% of all residents.

As of 2000, Miramar had the fifth highest percentage of Jamaican residents in the United States, with 15.4% of the populace, the 58th highest percentage of Colombian residents in the US, at 2.51% of the city's population, and the 48th highest percentage of Cuban residents in the US, at 8.77% of the city's population. It also had the 78th most Dominicans in the US, at 1.98%, while it had the 31st highest percentage of Haitians (tied with West Little River), at 6% of all residents. Miramar's Trinidadian community had the 12th highest percentage of residents, which was at 1.2% (tied with Wheatley Heights, New York, and Neptune City, New Jersey).

Economy

Spirit Airlines moved to Miramar from Eastpointe, Michigan, in November 1999. JL Audio and Arise Virtual Solutions are also headquartered in Miramar.

The Leadership in Energy & Environment Design in Miramar houses the Federal Bureau of Investigation (FBI) Miami field office and a General Services Administration (GSA) office; named after two FBI agents who died in the 1986 FBI Miami Shootout, it is a  Leadership in Energy & Environment Design (LEED) facility located on a  site. The FBI field office, previously in North Miami Beach, moved to Miramar on December 8, 2014. The building was dedicated on April 10, 2015.

Top employers

According to Miramar's 2016 Comprehensive Annual Financial Report, the top employers in the city were:

Landmarks

The Miramar Cultural Center and ArtsPark was created to celebrate creativity and diversity within the city. Located in the heart of the Miramar Town Center, situated adjacent to City Hall and centrally located, the center is visible and accessible from Red Road, Miramar Boulevard and Hiatus Road and features ample free parking on-site.

The Miramar Branch Library Education Center's collection consists of over 80,000 items in all media and genres. The library also offers video games in several PlayStation, Xbox and Wii formats. Other features include a 100-seat multi-purpose room, conference room, group study room, several tutoring rooms and over 50 public computers and printed with instruction and special software available in its Computer Center.

The Miramar Regional Park Amphitheater provides an opportunity for live concert performances and outdoor entertainment to be housed and produced in a uniquely developed venue in South Florida. An open-air venue that will seat 5,000 people (3,000 covered canopy; 2,000 grass area), it is also used for film and television production. Amenities includes a ticket booth, electronic signage, lakes, and fountains.

Education

Miramar is served by Broward County Public Schools.

Public schools

 Elementary schools

 Middle schools
 New Renaissance Middle School
 Glades Middle School
 Silver Trail Middle School in Pembroke Pines – People living in the conservation area between Interstate 75 and the county line are zoned to Silver Trail Middle.

 K–8 schools
 Annabel C. Perry K–8

 High schools
 Everglades High School
 Miramar High School

 Alternative schools
 Henry D. Perry Education Center

Charter schools

 Somerset Academy Miramar Elementary Charter School
 Somerset Academy Central Miramar Elementary Charter School
 Somerset Academy Miramar Middle Charter School
 Somerset Academy Central Miramar Middle Charter School
 Somerset Academy Central Miramar High Charter School

Private schools

The Roman Catholic Archdiocese of Miami operates Catholic schools. Saint Bartholomew Catholic School is in Miramar.

Saint Stephen Catholic School opened in 1956. It opened in the 1950s and closed in 2009, with the building rented to a charter school.

Trade schools

 DeVry University
 Chamberlain College of Nursing
 University of Phoenix
 Strayer University
 Le Cordon Bleu

Higher education

 Broward College (Miramar Town Center)
 Broward College (Miramar West Center)
 Florida International University (FIU) (Miramar West Center)
 Nova Southeastern University (Miramar Campus)
University of Florida MBA (South Florida Campus)

Government

Municipal government

On June 20, 1955, the city's inaugural mayor and city council were sworn in, all having been appointed by the Governor of Florida. They all served until the city's first municipal elections were held in 1959.

The city's current mayor is Wayne Messam.

Miramar currently operates under a council–manager government.

Up until March 13, 1991, the city had previously operated under the "strong mayor" form of the mayor–city council form of government. In 1989, by unanimous accord of the mayor and the Miramar City Commission, work was laid to study changing to a council–manager form of government. On March 14, 1990, Miramar voters approved a referendum to change to this form of government.

List of mayors

Media

Miramar is a part of the Miami-Fort Lauderdale-Hollywood media market, which is the twelfth largest radio market and the seventeenth largest television market in the United States. Its primary daily newspapers are the South Florida-Sun Sentinel and The Miami Herald, and their Spanish-language counterparts El Sentinel and El Nuevo Herald. WTVJ, the Miami area's NBC owned and operated station and WSCV, the Telemundo station also owned by NBC shares their studios and administrative offices in Miramar.

Notable people

 Jon Beason, NFL football player
 Daniel Braverman, NFL football player
 Lionel Brown, professional soccer player and U.S. Virgin Islands national team player
 David E. Canter, sports agent
 Wayne Cochran, American soul singer
 Johnny Depp, actor
 Jason Derulo, singer
 Oronde Gadsden II, American football player for the Syracuse Orange
 Larry Gordon, NFL football player
 Alcee Hastings, U.S. Representative
 Tracy Howard, NFL football player
 Wayne Messam, former presidential candidate
 Michael Mizrachi, professional poker player
 Geno Smith, NFL football player
 Elvis Trujillo, jockey

See also 

 2019 Miramar shootout

References

External links
 City of Miramar official website

 
Cities in Broward County, Florida
Populated places established in 1955
Cities in Florida
1955 establishments in Florida